The Royal Grammar School (RGS), Newcastle upon Tyne, is a selective British private day school for pupils aged between 7 and 18 years. Founded in 1525 by Thomas Horsley, the Mayor of Newcastle upon Tyne, it received royal foundation by Queen Elizabeth I and is the city's oldest institution of learning. It is one of seven schools in the United Kingdom to bear the name "Royal Grammar School", of which two others are part of the independent sector.

The school is located in Jesmond, Newcastle upon Tyne, in North East England, and is a member of the Headmasters' and Headmistresses' Conference.  In 2008, RGS became fully co-educational after 450 years as an all boys' school. It has a current enrolment of more than 1,300 pupils. Former students are known as Old Novocastrians or Old Novos ("Novocastrian" is macaronic Latin for "citizen of Newcastle").

In 2012 and again in 2015, the Sunday Times Schools Guide named RGS the top performing school in the North of England based on academic results from A-levels and GCSEs.

History
The RGS was founded in 1525 by Thomas Horsley, within the grounds of St Nicholas' Church, Newcastle. Planning is believed to have begun as early as 1477. The site has moved five times since then, most recently to Jesmond in 1906. The new school building, designed by Sir Edward Cooper, was officially opened on 17 January 1907 by the 7th Duke of Northumberland.

An 1868 description reads:
There are many public schools, the principal one being the Royal Free Grammar school founded in 1525 by Thomas Horsley, Mayor of Newcastle, and made a royal foundation by Queen Elizabeth. It is held in the old hall of St. Mary's Hospital, built in the reign of James I., and has an income from endowment of about £500, besides a share in Bishop Crew's 12 exhibitions at Lincoln College, Oxford, lately abolished, and several exhibitions to Cambridge. The number of scholars is about 140. Hugh Moises, and Dawes, author of "Miscellanea Critica," were once head-masters, and many celebrated men have ranked among its pupils, including W. Elstob, Bishop Ridley, Mark Akenside, the poet, Chief Justice Chambers, Brand, the antiquary and town historian, Horsley, the antiquary, and Lords Eldon, Stowell, and Collingwood.

George III, on reading one of Admiral Collingwood's despatches after Trafalgar, asked how the seaman had learned to write such splendid English, but he answered himself, recalling that, along with Eldon and Stowell, he had been a pupil of Hugh Moises: "I forgot. He was one of Moises' boys."

For the duration of the Second World War the school was evacuated en masse to Penrith, Cumbria, where a special train carrying staff and around 800 pupils arrived on 1 September 1939. Meanwhile, the main school building was transformed into the Regional War Room, which undertook the vital strategic role of collating details of air raids across the region and passing these on to RAF Fighter Command. Several rudimentary air raid shelters were built above ground for military personnel, which although substantial enough to survive as store rooms until the end of the century would have offered little protection, even from an indirect hit. The school was one of several places in Newcastle upon Tyne where a small supply of ammunition to be used in the event of a German invasion was stored.

Description

School grounds

The RGS is located opposite the Newcastle Prep School, and close to Newcastle High School for Girls, a single-sex girls' school formed through the merger of the Central High and Church High girls' schools.

The school has its own swimming pool, climbing wall and gym.

Organisation

Throughout the school (years 3–13) are four houses, named Collingwood (yellow), Eldon (green), Horsley (blue) and Stowell (red), although the Junior School previously had separate houses, named after colours (red, white, and blue). The Senior School is located on Eskdale Terrace. The Junior School was housed on the adjoining Lambton Road, but a new Junior School on the main school site has been in use since September 2006.

Geoffrey Stanford is Headmaster as of February 2020, replacing John Fern. There are 91 members of teaching staff in the Senior School. In the Junior School there are 16 members of teaching staff including the Headmaster James Miller. There are also approximately 68 members of maintenance staff and 14 private music tutors.

The RGS school uniform was updated for all new pupils as of September 2006, and was then updated further in 2012–2013.

Clubs and societies

The RGS has Combined Cadet Force (CCF) Army, Navy and RAF contingents, open to both boys and girls. Cadets have weekly training sessions after school, and opportunities to go on extended training and adventure trips during the holidays. The Army section of NRGS CCF is affiliated to the Royal Regiment of Fusiliers, and the Navy Section are affiliated to HMS Calliope, a stone frigate which is situated on the Tyne next to the Baltic Art Gallery.

In 2004 the school hosted the first Northern Junior Debating Championship, which has now become an annual competition. The society also regularly enters teams for other competitions, and has reached the finals' day of both the Oxford Union and Cambridge Union schools' competitions in recent years, winning the Cambridge Union competition in 2010. At a junior level, RGS won the Northern Junior Debating Competition in 2005, 2006, 2010 and 2014.

The primary sports that are played at RGS are rugby, hockey, fencing, football, netball, cricket, swimming, and athletics.

Magazines

The school magazine, Novo, comes out annually. A student-run newspaper, the Issue, came into being in the late 1990s; after a period of inactivity, it was relaunched as the re-Issue in September 2003. It ran roughly twice per term until its demise in summer 2005, but was replaced in early 2006 by The Grammar. At the end of the 2009–2010 academic year, The Grammar folded. In 2011 a new magazine called  Vox was set up but is currently out of print. In 2017, an online group RGmemeS came into being. It is currently inactive.

Other

From 1965, the school held a "Prizegiving" ceremony each November, to recognise academic achievement and bring the school together. Due to declining interest by parents, students, and teachers, the school replaced this in 2007 with a series of smaller gatherings and a public festival.

However, in 2009, Headmaster Bernard Trafford announced that a new Prizegiving ceremony, "RGS Day", would be hosted on the Saturday of the penultimate week of the school year.

The former Head of Drama, Jeremy Thomas, who had taught at the school for 28 years prior to leaving due to ill health, died December 2006. Thomas had campaigned for years for a new Performing Arts Centre, but died before being able to see the finished product.

Buildings and grounds
The RGS's main buildings are in a complex located on Eskdale Terrace, Jesmond, Newcastle upon Tyne. The school hall houses an organ donated by Sir Arthur Sutherland to commemorate the 138 former pupils who were killed during the First World War.

There have since been a number of large-scale building operations to provide the school with better facilities and to accommodate for the expansion of the school as it prepared to admit girls at all major entrance points from September 2006.

In 1997, Professor Richard Dawkins opened the new Science and Technology Centre (STC), with Physics and Design & Technology laboratories downstairs, and Chemistry and Biology laboratories upstairs. In 2003 the STC was renamed The Neil Goldie Centre in memory of Neil Goldie, who died earlier that year. At the time he was the school's Head of Science and Technology.

In 1996, a new Sports' Hall containing basketball courts and updated gymnastics facilities was opened. The building also provides facilities for table tennis, fencing, and weight-training, plus a gymnasium and climbing wall.

In 2005, the music and economics block was demolished. A new Performing Arts Centre and Modern Languages department was completed in September 2006. It includes a 300-seat auditorium, named the "Miller Theater" in memory of former headmaster James Miller, for school concerts and productions, a musical recital hall, a drama/dance studio, recording facilities, a band room, a percussion room, and a number of classrooms.

A floodlit all-weather surface has been in use since January 2006, on land that once was part of the school field. Aside from the school field, which is primarily used for rugby union, the school also owns land in nearby Jesmond for sports use. This was given to the school in recompense for the land it lost when the flyover was created at the top of the school – eating into some of the land owned by the school. The school is also the landlords of Sutherland Park in Benton. Sutherland Park is named after Arthur Sutherland (1878–1883), who bought the grounds of Benton Lodge in 1925 for Novocastrians Rugby Football Club. The ground and clubhouse was sold to the school at a later date. The club was set up by former pupils of the school in 1899; many Old Novos still represent and play for the club to this day. The school has also recently agreed a 50-year lease of the County Cricket Ground on Osborne Avenue, Jesmond.

In October 2015, the school was the team base for the Scottish national rugby union team during the 2015 Rugby World Cup.

In October 2019 a new library, art facilities and pastoral care centre, was opened. In addition, the school also redeveloped the sixth form area, which opened in January 2020.

School motto
The school has the motto, Discendo duces (By learning you will lead).

Notable alumni

Former pupils are known as Old Novocastrians, which is also a demonym for a person from Newcastle upon Tyne.

16th century
 Nicholas Ridley (died 16 October 1555), English clergyman and Protestant martyr
 Thomas Brandling (1512–1590), founder of the Brandling land and coal owning dynasty

17th century
 Brian Walton (1600–1661), English divine and scholar
 Colonel Robert Lilburne (1613–1665), regicide
 John Lilburne (1614–1657), "Freeborn John"
 William Elstob (1674?–1715), Anglo-Saxon scholar and Church of England clergyman
 Henry Bourne (1694–1733), historian

18th century
 John Horsley (c. 1685–1732), archaeologist
 Anthony Askew (fl. 1699–1774), physician and book collector
 Mark Akenside (1721–1770), 18th century English poet and physician
 Sir Robert Chambers (1737–1803), jurist, Vinerian Professor of English Law, and Chief Justice of Bengal
 Charles Hutton (1737–1823), mathematician
 John Brand (1744–1806), 18th century English historian
 William Scott, 1st Baron Stowell (1745–1836), English judge and jurist
 Cuthbert Collingwood, 1st Baron Collingwood (1750–1810), Admiral Lord Collingwood of Trafalgar fame
 John Scott, 1st Earl of Eldon (1751–1838), Lord High Chancellor of Great Britain
 George Hall, Bishop of Dromore (1753–1811)
 John Adamson (1787–1855), antiquary and Portuguese scholar
 John Bigge (1780–1843), English judge and royal commissioner
 Thomas Addison (1793–1860), renowned 19th-century English physician and scientist

19th century
 Albany Hancock (1806–1873), zoologist
 John Hancock  (1808–1890), father of modern taxidermy
 Sir William George Armstrong, 1st Baron Armstrong, (1810–1900), industrialist
 John Forster (1812–1876), biographer, critic and lunacy commissioner
 William Loftus (1820–1858), discoverer of Uruk
 Richard Austin Bastow (1839–1920), Australian naturalist and bryologist
 George Swinburne (1861–1928) Australian engineer, politician and public man
 Robert Burns Dick (1868–1954), architect, city planner and artist
 Sir Arthur Sutherland (1878–1883), industrialist and politician
 Tod Slaughter (1885–1956), actor
 Edward Clark (1888–1962), conductor and BBC music producer
 John Brass (colliery manager) (1879–?), President of the Institution of Mining Engineers, assessor at the Gresford disaster inquiry
 Ronald Hall (1895–1975), Anglican bishop

20th century
 Samuel Segal, Baron Segal, (1902–1985), Physician, Labour Party politician and Deputy Speaker of the House of Lords
 Lúcio Costa (1902–1998), Brazilian architect, designer of the Pilot Plan of Brasília
 Sir Douglas Macfadyen, KCB CBE (1902–1968) Air Officer Commanding-in-Chief at RAF Home Command
 Sir Harry Livermore(1908- 1989) Lawyer and Lord Mayor of Liverpool
 Arthur Blenkinsop (1911–1979), British Labour Party politician
 Sir Richard Southern (1912–2001), historian
 Denys Hay (1915–1994), historian
 Eric Saint (1918–1989), physician and professor of medicine
 George Gale (1927–1990), political journalist
 Brian Redhead (1929–1994), presenter of BBC Radio 4's Today (1975–1993)
 Peter Taylor, Baron Taylor of Gosforth (1930–1997), Lord Chief Justice (1992–96)
 Sir Geoffrey Bindman (b. 1933), lawyer
 Professor Sir George Alberti (b. 1937), President of the Royal College of Physicians (1997–2002)
 Steven Lukes (born 1941), Social and political theorist
 Sir Alistair Graham (b. 1942), Chairman of the Committee on Standards in Public Life
 Jeremy Beecham, Baron Beecham (b. 1944), Politician
 Timothy Kirkhope (born 1945), Baron Kirkhope of Harrogate 2016, Former MEP 1999-2016, and MP 1987–97. Lawyer.
 Peter Kellner (born 1946), journalist
 Nik Cohn (born 1946), rock journalist
 Paul Torday (1946–2013), author
 Professor Sir Ian Gilmore (b. 1947), President of the Royal College of Physicians (2006–2011)
 Sir Derek Wanless (1947–2012), banker, government adviser, author of reports on health and social care
Sir Greg Winter CBE FMedSci FRS (b. 1951), Nobel Prize laureate and Master of Trinity College, Cambridge
 Gareth A. Morris (born 1954), chemist
 John Harle (born 1956), saxophonist and composer
 John Ashton (born 1956), diplomat
 Jim Pollock (born 1958) Scottish International, Barbarian FC and Novocastrians Captain
 Ian Lucas (born 1960), MP
 Andrew Parker (born 1962), Director-General of the British Security Service (MI5)
 Peter Coles (born 1963), theoretical cosmologist
Jonathan Webb (born 1963), England rugby International
Max Hill QC (born 1964), Director of Public Prosecutions, Crown Prosecution Service
 Bharat Nalluri (born 1964), Television Director
 Paul W. Franks (born 1964), Professor of Philosophy and Judaic Studies, Yale University
 Paul W. S. Anderson (born 1965), Film Director
 Nick Brownlee (born 1967), crime thriller writer
 Simon Johnson (born 1970), cricketer
 Rhodri Talfan Davies (born 1971), Director of BBC Cymru
 Alastair Leithead (born 1971), BBC Journalist
 Caspar Berry (born 1974), professional poker player, screenwriter, actor and television presenter on Poker Night Live
 Nicky Peng (born 1982), English cricketer
 Matthew Thompson (born 1982), English & Newcastle Falcons RFU player
 Mark Wallace (born 1984), political journalist
 Fraser Forster (born 1988), Professional Footballer (goalkeeper) with Southampton
 Will Welch (born 1990), Professional rugby player with Newcastle Falcons
 Daniel Young (born 1990), cricketer
 Joel Hodgson (born 1992), Professional rugby player with Newcastle Falcons
 Abigail Thorn  (born 1993), Philosophy YouTuber
 Will Nicholls (born 1995), wildlife cameraman

Notable staff
 James Jurin, Head Master 1709–1715
 Richard Dawes, Head Master 1738–1749
 Hugh Moises, Head Master 1749–1806
 George Ferris Whidborne Mortimer, Head Master 1828–1833
 Max Black, Head of Mathematics 1931–1936
 Michael Roberts, Mathematics 1931–1941
 John Elders, Sports Master 1957–1982 and 1992–1996; England Rugby Head Coach
 William Feaver, History and Art 1965–1971
 Jim Pollock, Sports Master (Rugby) 2002-2019; Scotland Rugby International

See also
 List of the oldest schools in the United Kingdom
 List of Old Novocastrians with articles on Wikipedia
 List of mayors of Newcastle upon Tyne

Notes

References

External links
 Early History of the School
 RGS website
 Old Novocastrians Association website

1525 establishments in England
Educational institutions established in the 1520s
Educational institutions established in the 1540s
Private schools in Newcastle upon Tyne
Member schools of the Headmasters' and Headmistresses' Conference